Albert Champion (27 December 1851 – 30 June 1909) was an English first-class cricketer, who appeared for both Yorkshire and Lancashire over the course of fifteen years of sporadic appearances.

Born in Hollins End, Handsworth, Yorkshire, England, Champion played fourteen games for Yorkshire between 1876 and 1879, and reappeared for a single game for Lancashire against Nottinghamshire in 1886.  He played three more first-class games for Liverpool and District in 1889 and 1890, two against his native county.

A left-handed batsman, he scored 218 runs at a lowly 8.07, with a best of 29 against Yorkshire.  He took one wicket for Yorkshire, against Kent with his right arm medium pace, at a cost of 17 runs.

Champion died in Wortley, near Barnsley.

References

External links
Cricinfo Profile

1851 births
1909 deaths
Cricketers from Sheffield
Yorkshire cricketers
English cricketers
Lancashire cricketers
Liverpool and District cricketers
English cricketers of 1864 to 1889
English cricketers of 1890 to 1918